Oćestovo is a village in municipality of Knin in Šibenik-Knin County, Croatia.

References

Populated places in Šibenik-Knin County
Knin